Žirovski Vrh may refer to the following places in Slovenia:

 Žirovski Vrh, Žiri
 Žirovski Vrh Svetega Antona
 Žirovski Vrh Svetega Urbana
 Žirovski Vrh, a former uranium mine in Todraž